Shirvan (also Romanized as Shīrvān) is a city and capital of Shirvan County, North Khorasan Province, Iran. At the 2006 census, its population was 162,790, in 70,878 families.

Etymology 
The name of this city branches from the old Persian word, Shīr ('Lion'). It might be because of the mountain in the south of the city which looks like a big lion at rest. The history of Shirvan is more than 7000 years old, as archaeologists found some graves in Gelian and Khanlogh (Villages of Shirvan) which are related to Achaemenid Empire era. The city was fortified and strengthened as a fort city during the Safavid era to defend it against hostile raiding Turkmens.

Geographical location 
Shirvan is located at a latitude of 37 degrees and 40 minutes and a longitude of 57 degrees and 93 minutes with an altitude of 1097 meters above sea level and an area of 3789 square meters. The city of Ashgabat is bounded on the north by the capital of Turkmenistan, on the south by the city of Esfarayen, on the east by the city of Farooj and on the west by Bojnourd. The city of Shirvan is located near the Atrak River. Shirvan, 22 km away, is the closest city to Ashgabat, the capital of Turkmenistan.

Significance 
The city has been significant industrially with sugar beet factories. It is also significant historically (Nader hill), geographically (Honameh), and anthropologically (caves around the city).

Universities 
Shirvan Higher Education Complex

Shirvan Health Higher Education Complex

Islamic Azad University, Shirvan Branch

Professor Hesabi Boys' Technical School

See also 

 Ban Shirvan
 Bi Bi Shirvan
 Karkhaneh-ye Qand-e Shirvan
 Now Shirvan Kola
 Shirvan
 Shirvan County
 Shirvan District
 Shirvan, Lorestan
 Shirvan Mahalleh
 Shirvan Rural District
 Shirvan Shahlu

References 

Populated places in Shirvan County
Cities in North Khorasan Province

pnb:شیروان (شہر)